Vasilios Kalogeracos (born 21 March 1975) is an Australian former football (soccer) player. A prominent forward, Kalogeracos has played for Birmingham City and Stockport County in England, Waterford United in Ireland and Kuala Lumpur in Malaysia.

References
General
 Vasilios Kalogeracos's career statistics at OzFootball

Specific

1975 births
Living people
Soccer players from Perth, Western Australia
Australian soccer players
Australian expatriate soccer players
Australian expatriate sportspeople in England
Australian people of Greek descent
Expatriate footballers in Malaysia
National Soccer League (Australia) players
Perth Glory FC players
South Melbourne FC players
Birmingham City F.C. players
Stevenage F.C. players
Stockport County F.C. players
Floreat Athena FC players
English Football League players
Association football forwards